Aortic dissection (AD) occurs when an injury to the innermost layer of the aorta allows blood to flow between the layers of the aortic wall, forcing the layers apart. In most cases, this is associated with a sudden onset of severe chest or back pain, often described as "tearing" in character. Also, vomiting, sweating, and lightheadedness may occur. Other symptoms may result from decreased blood supply to other organs, such as stroke, lower extremity ischemia, or mesenteric ischemia. Aortic dissection can quickly lead to death from insufficient blood flow to the heart or complete rupture of the aorta.

AD is more common in those with a history of high blood pressure; a number of connective tissue diseases that affect blood vessel wall strength including Marfan syndrome and Ehlers–Danlos syndrome; a bicuspid aortic valve; and previous heart surgery. Major trauma, smoking, cocaine use, pregnancy, a thoracic aortic aneurysm, inflammation of arteries, and abnormal lipid levels are also associated with an increased risk. The diagnosis is suspected based on symptoms with medical imaging, such as CT scan, MRI, or ultrasound used to confirm and further evaluate the dissection. The two main types are Stanford type A, which involves the first part of the aorta, and type B, which does not.

Prevention is by blood pressure control and smoking cessation. Management of AD depends on the part of the aorta involved. Dissections that involve the first part of the aorta (adjacent to the heart) usually require surgery. Surgery may be done either by an opening in the chest or from inside the blood vessel. Dissections that involve the second part of the aorta can typically be treated with medications that lower blood pressure and heart rate, unless there are complications which then require surgical correction.

AD is relatively rare, occurring at an estimated rate of three per 100,000 people per year. It is more common in men than women. The typical age at diagnosis is 63, with about 10% of cases occurring before the age of 40. Without treatment, about half of people with Stanford type A dissections die within three days and about 10% of people with Stanford type B dissections die within one month. The first case of AD was described in the examination of King George II of Great Britain following his death in 1760. Surgery for AD was introduced in the 1950s by Michael E. DeBakey.

Signs and symptoms
About 96% of individuals with AD present with severe pain that had a sudden onset. The pain may be described as a tearing, stabbing, or sharp sensation in the chest, back, or abdomen. About 17% of individuals feel the pain migrate as the dissection extends down the aorta. The location of pain is associated with the location of the dissection. Anterior chest pain is associated with dissections involving the ascending aorta, while interscapular back pain is associated with descending aortic dissections. If the pain is pleuritic in nature, it may suggest acute pericarditis caused by bleeding into the sac surrounding the heart. This is a particularly dangerous eventuality, suggesting that acute pericardial tamponade may be imminent. Pericardial tamponade is the most common cause of death from AD.

While the pain may be confused with that of a heart attack, AD is usually not associated with the other suggestive signs, such as heart failure and ECG changes. Less common symptoms that may be seen in the setting of AD include congestive heart failure (7%), fainting (9%), stroke (6%), ischemic peripheral neuropathy, paraplegia, and cardiac arrest. If the individual fainted, about half the time it is due to bleeding into the pericardium, leading to pericardial tamponade. Neurological complications of aortic dissection, such as stroke and paralysis, are due to the involvement of one or more arteries supplying portions of the central nervous system.

If the AD involves the abdominal aorta, compromise of one or both renal arteries occurs in 5–8% of cases, while ischemia of the intestines occurs about 3% of the time.

Blood pressure
People with AD often have a history of high blood pressure. The blood pressure is quite variable at presentation with acute AD. It tends to be higher in individuals with a distal dissection. In individuals with a proximal AD, 36% present with hypertension, while 25% present with hypotension. Proximal AD tends to be associated with weakening of the vascular wall due to cystic medial degeneration. In those who present with distal (Stanford type B) AD, 60–70% present with high blood pressure, while 2–3% present with low blood pressure.

Severe hypotension at presentation is a grave prognostic indicator. It is usually associated with pericardial tamponade, severe aortic insufficiency, or rupture of the aorta. Accurate measurement of blood pressure is important. Pseudohypotension (falsely low blood-pressure measurement) may occur due to involvement of the brachiocephalic artery (supplying the right arm) or the left subclavian artery (supplying the left arm).

Aortic insufficiency
Aortic insufficiency (AI) occurs in half to two-thirds of ascending AD, and the diastolic heart murmur of aortic insufficiency is audible in about 32% of proximal dissections. The intensity (loudness) of the murmur depends on the blood pressure and may be inaudible in the event of low blood pressure.

Multiple causes exist for AI in the setting of ascending AD. The dissection may dilate the annulus of the aortic valve, preventing the leaflets of the valve from coapting. The dissection may extend into the aortic root and detach the aortic valve leaflets. Alternatively, following an extensive intimal tear, the intimal flap may prolapse into the left ventricular outflow tract, causing intimal intussusception into the aortic valve, thereby preventing proper valve closure.

Myocardial infarction
Heart attack occurs in 1–2% of aortic dissections. Infarction is caused by the involvement of the coronary arteries, which supply the heart with oxygenated blood, in the dissection. The right coronary artery is involved more commonly than the left coronary artery. If the myocardial infarction is treated with thrombolytic therapy, the mortality increases to over 70%, mostly due to bleeding into the pericardial sac, causing cardiac tamponade.

Pleural effusion
A pleural effusion (fluid collection in the space between the lungs and the chest wall or diaphragm) can be due to either blood from a transient rupture of the aorta or fluid due to an inflammatory reaction around the aorta. If a pleural effusion were to develop due to AD, it is more common in the left hemithorax rather than the right hemithorax.

Predisposing factors 
Aortic dissection is associated with hypertension (high blood pressure) and many connective tissue disorders. Vasculitis (inflammation of an artery) is rarely associated with aortic dissection. It can also be the result of chest trauma. About 72 to 80% of individuals who present with an aortic dissection have a previous history of hypertension. Illicit drug use with stimulants such as cocaine and methamphetamine is also a modifiable risk factor for AD. It can also be caused by smoking.

A bicuspid aortic valve (a type of congenital heart disease involving the aortic valve) is found in 7–14% of individuals who have an aortic dissection. These individuals are prone to dissection in the ascending aorta. The risk of dissection in individuals with bicuspid aortic valves is not associated with the degree of stenosis of the valve.

Connective tissue disorders such as Marfan syndrome, Ehlers–Danlos syndrome, and Loeys–Dietz syndrome increase the risk of aortic dissection. Similarly, vasculitides such as Takayasu's arteritis, giant cell arteritis, polyarteritis nodosa, and Behçet's disease have been associated with a subsequent aortic dissection.  Marfan Syndrome is found in 5–9% of individuals who had an aortic dissection. In this subset, the incidence in young individuals is increased. Individuals with Marfan syndrome tend to have aneurysms of the aorta and are more prone to proximal dissections of the aorta.

Turner syndrome also increases the risk of aortic dissection, by aortic root dilatation.

Chest trauma leading to aortic dissection can be divided into two groups based on cause: blunt chest trauma (commonly seen in car accidents) and iatrogenic. Iatrogenic causes include trauma during cardiac catheterization or due to an intra-aortic balloon pump.

Aortic dissection may be a late sequela of heart surgery. About 18% of individuals who present with an acute aortic dissection have a history of open-heart surgery. Individuals who have undergone aortic valve replacement for aortic insufficiency are at particularly high risk because aortic regurgitation causes increased blood flow in the ascending aorta. This can cause dilatation and weakening of the walls of the ascending aorta.

Syphilis only potentially causes aortic dissection in its tertiary stage.

Pathophysiology

As with all other arteries, the aorta is made up of three layers, the intima, the media, and the adventitia. The intima is in direct contact with the blood inside the vessel, and mainly consists of a layer of endothelial cells on a basement membrane; the media contains connective and muscle tissue, and the vessel is protected on the outside by the adventitia, comprising connective tissue.

In an aortic dissection, blood penetrates the intima and enters the media layer. The high pressure rips the tissue of the media apart along the laminated plane splitting the inner two-thirds and the outer one-third of the media apart. This can propagate along the length of the aorta for a variable distance forward or backward. Dissections that propagate towards the iliac bifurcation (with the flow of blood) are called anterograde dissections and those that propagate towards the aortic root (opposite of the flow of blood) are called retrograde dissections. The initial tear is usually within 100 mm of the aortic valve, so a retrograde dissection can easily compromise the pericardium leading to a hemopericardium. Anterograde dissections may propagate all the way to the iliac bifurcation of the aorta, rupture the aortic wall, or recanalize into the intravascular lumen leading to a double-barrel aorta. The double-barrel aorta relieves the pressure of blood flow and reduces the risk of rupture. Rupture leads to hemorrhaging into a body cavity, and prognosis depends on the area of rupture. Retroperitoneal and pericardial ruptures are both possible.

The initiating event in aortic dissection is a tear in the intimal lining of the aorta. Due to the high pressures in the aorta, blood enters the media at the point of the tear.  The force of the blood entering the media causes the tear to extend. It may extend proximally (closer to the heart) or distally (away from the heart) or both. The blood travels through the media, creating a false lumen (the true lumen is the normal conduit of blood in the aorta). Separating the false lumen from the true lumen is a layer of intimal tissue known as the intimal flap.

The vast majority of aortic dissections originate with an intimal tear in either the ascending aorta (65%), the aortic arch (10%), or just distal to the ligamentum arteriosum in the descending thoracic aorta (20%).

As blood flows down the false lumen, it may cause secondary tears in the intima. Through these secondary tears, the blood can re-enter the true lumen.

While it is not always clear why an intimal tear may occur, quite often it involves degeneration of the collagen and elastin that make up the media. This is known as cystic medial necrosis and is most commonly associated with Marfan syndrome and is also associated with Ehlers-Danlos syndrome.

In about 13% of aortic dissections, no evidence of an intimal tear is found. In these cases, the inciting event is thought to be an intramural hematoma (caused by bleeding within the media). Since no direct connection exists between the true lumen and the false lumen in these cases, diagnosing an aortic dissection by aortography is difficult if the cause is an intramural hematoma. An aortic dissection secondary to an intramural hematoma should be treated the same as one caused by an intimal tear.

Diagnosis
Because of the varying symptoms of aortic dissection, the diagnosis is sometimes difficult to make. Concern should be increased in those with low blood pressure, neurological problems, and an unequal pulses.

While taking a good history from the individual may be strongly suggestive of an aortic dissection, the diagnosis cannot always be made by history and physical signs alone.  Often, the diagnosis is made by visualization of the intimal flap on a diagnostic imaging test. Common tests used to diagnose an aortic dissection include a CT scan of the chest with iodinated contrast material and a transesophageal echocardiogram. The proximity of the aorta to the esophagus allows the use of higher-frequency ultrasound for better anatomical images. Other tests that may be used include an aortogram or magnetic resonance angiogram of the aorta.  Each of these tests has pros and cons, and they do not have equal sensitivities and specificities in the diagnosis of aortic dissection.

In general, the imaging technique chosen is based on the pretest likelihood of the diagnosis, availability of the testing modality, patient stability, and the sensitivity and specificity of the test.

D-dimer
A measurement of blood D-dimer level may be useful in diagnostic evaluation. A level less than 500 ng/ml may be considered evidence against a diagnosis of aortic dissection, although this guideline is only applicable in cases deemed "low risk" and within 24 hours of symptom onset. The American Heart Association does not advise using this test in making the diagnosis, as evidence is still tentative.

Chest X-ray

Chest radiography may although demonstrate a change in the morphology of the thoracic aorta which can be seen in aortic dissection. Classically, new widening of the mediastinum on radiograph is of moderate sensitivity for detecting an ascending aortic dissection; however, this finding is of low specificity, as many other conditions can cause apparent widening of the mediastinum.

There are several other associated radiographic findings:
 The "calcium sign" describes an apparent separation of the intimal calcification from the outer aortic margin by greater than 10 mm.
 Pleural effusions, more commonly in descending aortic dissections, and typically left-sided.
 Other: the obliteration of the aortic knob, depression of the left mainstem bronchus, loss of the paratracheal stripe, and tracheal deviation.
Importantly, about 12 to 20% of aortic dissections are not detectable by chest radiograph; therefore, a "normal" chest radiograph does not rule out aortic dissection. If there is high clinical suspicion, a more sensitive imaging test (CT angiogram, MR angiography, or transesophageal echo) may be warranted.

Computed tomography
Computed tomography angiography is a fast, non-invasive test that gives an accurate three-dimensional view of the aorta. These images are produced by taking rapid, thin-cut slices of the chest and abdomen, and combining them in the computer to create cross-sectional slices. To delineate the aorta to the accuracy necessary to make the proper diagnosis, an iodinated contrast material is injected into a peripheral vein. Contrast is injected and the scan performed using a bolus tracking method. This type of scan is timed to injection to capture the contrast as it enters the aorta. The scan then follows the contrast as it flows through the vessel. It has a sensitivity of 96 to 100% and a specificity of 96 to 100%. Disadvantages include the need for iodinated contrast material and the inability to diagnose the site of the intimal tear.

MRI

Magnetic resonance imaging (MRI) is also used for the detection and assessment of aortic dissection, with a sensitivity of 98% and a specificity of 98%. An MRI examination of the aorta produces a three-dimensional reconstruction of the aorta, allowing the physician to determine the location of the intimal tear and the involvement of branch vessels, and to locate any secondary tears. It is a noninvasive test, does not require the use of iodinated contrast material, and can detect and quantitate the degree of aortic insufficiency.

The disadvantage of the MRI scan in the face of aortic dissection is that it may be available only in larger hospitals, and the scan is relatively time-consuming, which could be dangerous in people who are already very unwell. Due to the high-intensity magnetic fields used during MRI, it cannot be used on individuals with metallic implants. In addition, some individuals experience claustrophobia while surrounded by the MRI magnet.

Ultrasound

The transesophageal echocardiogram (TEE) is a good test in the diagnosis of aortic dissection, with a sensitivity up to 98% and a specificity up to 97%. It has become the preferred imaging modality for suspected aortic dissection. It is a relatively noninvasive test, requiring the individual to swallow the echocardiography probe. It is especially good in the evaluation of AI in the setting of ascending aortic dissection and to determine whether the ostia (origins) of the coronary arteries are involved. While many institutions give sedation during transesophageal echocardiography for added patient comfort, it can be performed in cooperative individuals without the use of sedation. Disadvantages of TEE include the inability to visualize the distal ascending aorta (the beginning of the aortic arch), and the descending abdominal aorta that lies below the stomach. A TEE may be technically difficult to perform in individuals with esophageal strictures or varices.

Aortogram

An aortogram involves the placement of a catheter in the aorta and injection of contrast material while taking X-rays of the aorta. The procedure is known as aortography. Previously thought to be the diagnostic gold standard, it has been supplanted by other, less-invasive imaging modalities.

Classification 

Several different classification systems have been used to describe aortic dissections. One such classification is based on chronicity and labels aortic dissections as hyperacute (<24 hours duration), acute (2–7 days), subacute (8–30 days), and chronic (>30 days). The systems commonly in use are based on either the anatomy of the dissection or the duration of onset of symptoms before the presentation. The Stanford system is used more commonly now, as it is more attuned to the management of the patient.

DeBakey 
The DeBakey system, named after cardiothoracic surgeon Michael E. DeBakey, is an anatomical description of the aortic dissection. It categorizes the dissection based on where the original intimal tear is located and the extent of the dissection (localized to either the ascending aorta or descending aorta or involving both the ascending and descending aorta).
 Type I – originates in ascending aorta, and propagates at least to the aortic arch and often beyond it distally. It is most often seen in patients less than 65 years of age and is the most lethal form of the disease.
 Type II – originates in the ascending aorta and is confined to it.
 Type III – originates in the descending aorta and rarely extends proximally, but will extend distally. It most often occurs in elderly patients with atherosclerosis and hypertension.

Stanford 
The Stanford classification is divided into two groups, A and B, depending on whether the ascending aorta is involved.
 A – involves the ascending aorta and/or aortic arch, and possibly the descending aorta. The tear can originate in the ascending aorta, the aortic arch, or more rarely, in the descending aorta. It includes DeBakey types I and II.
 B – involves the descending aorta or the arch (distal to the left subclavian artery), without the involvement of the ascending aorta. It includes DeBakey type III.

The Stanford classification is useful as it follows clinical practice, as type A ascending aortic dissections generally require primary surgical treatment, whereas type B dissections generally are treated medically as initial treatment with surgery reserved for any complications.

The main indication for surgical repair of type A dissections is the prevention of acute hemorrhagic pericardial tamponade due to leakage of blood through the dissected layers of the intrapericardial proximal aorta. A secondary indication is acute aortic valve insufficiency (regurgitation): ascending aortic dissections often involve the aortic valve, which, having lost its suspensory support, telescopes down into the aortic root, resulting in aortic incompetence. The valve must be resuspended to be reseated, as well as to repair or prevent coronary artery injury. Also, the area of dissection is removed and replaced with a Dacron graft to prevent further dissection from occurring. However, type B dissections are not improved, from a mortality point of view, by the operation, unless leaking, rupture, or compromise to other organs, e.g. kidneys, occurs.

Prevention
Among the recognized risk factors for aortic dissection, hypertension, abnormally high levels of lipids (such as cholesterol) in the blood, and smoking tobacco are considered preventable risk factors.

Management

In an acute dissection, treatment choice depends on its location. For Stanford type A (ascending aortic) dissection, surgical management is superior to medical management. For uncomplicated Stanford type B (distal aortic) dissections (including abdominal aortic dissections), medical management is preferred over surgery. Complicated Stanford type B aortic dissections require surgical intervention after initiation of medical therapy.

The risk of death due to aortic dissection is highest in the first few hours after the dissection begins, and decreases afterward. Because of this, the therapeutic strategies differ for the treatment of an acute dissection compared to a chronic dissection. An acute dissection is one in which the individual presents within the first two weeks. If the individual has managed to survive this window period, their prognosis is improved. About 66% of all dissections present in the acute phase. Individuals who present two weeks after the onset of the dissection are said to have chronic aortic dissections.  These individuals have been self-selected as survivors of the acute episode and can be treated with medical therapy as long as they are stable.

Medication
Aortic dissection generally presents as a hypertensive emergency, and the prime consideration of medical management is to decrease the shear stress in the aortic wall (dP/dt (force of ejection of blood from the left ventricle)) by decreasing blood pressure and the heart rate. The target blood pressure should be a mean arterial pressure (MAP) of 60 to 75 mmHg, or the lowest blood pressure tolerated. Initial decreases should be by about 20%. The target heart rate is less than 65 beats per minute. Long-term blood pressure control is required for every person who has experienced aortic dissection.

Beta blockers are the first-line treatment for patients with acute and chronic aortic dissection. In acute dissection, fast-acting agents can be given intravenously and have doses that are easier to adjust (such as esmolol, propranolol, or labetalol) is preferred. Vasodilators such as sodium nitroprusside can be considered for people with ongoing high blood pressure, but they should never be used alone, as they often stimulate a reflexive increase in the heart rate.

Calcium channel blockers can be used in the treatment of aortic dissection, particularly if a contraindication to the use of beta-blockers exists.  The calcium channel blockers typically used are verapamil and diltiazem, because of their combined vasodilator and negative inotropic effects.

If the individual has refractory hypertension (persistent hypertension on the maximum doses of three different classes of antihypertensive agents), involvement of the renal arteries in the aortic dissection plane should be considered.

Surgical
Indications for the surgical treatment of aortic dissection include an acute proximal aortic dissection and an acute distal aortic dissection with one or more complications.  Complications include compromise of a vital organ, rupture or impending rupture of the aorta, retrograde dissection into the ascending aorta. These are more common with a history of Marfan syndrome or Ehlers-Danlos syndrome.

The objective in the surgical management of aortic dissection is to resect (remove) the most severely damaged segments of the aorta and to obliterate the entry of blood into the false lumen (both at the initial intimal tear and any secondary tears along the vessel). While excision of the intimal tear may be performed, it does not significantly change mortality.

The particular treatment used depends on the segment or segments of the aorta involved. Some treatments are:
 Open aortic surgery with replacement of the damaged section of the aorta with a tube graft (often made of Dacron) when no damage to the aortic valve is seen
 Bentall procedure – replacement of the damaged section of the aorta and replacement of the aortic valve
 David procedure – replacement of the damaged section of the aorta and reimplantation of the aortic valve
 Thoracic endovascular aortic repair, a minimally invasive surgical procedure usually combined with ongoing medical management
 Replacement of the damaged section of the aorta with a sutureless vascular ring connector-reinforced Dacron graft: The vascular ring connector is a titanic ring used as a stent in the vascular graft to achieve a quick, blood-sealed, and sutureless anastomosis. Two furrows on the surface of the ring are for fixation of the vascular graft and the aorta. The tapes used to tie against the ring provide a larger contact surface area than the traditional stitches, thus it provides stronger anastomosis and better surgical results.

A number of comorbid conditions increase the surgical risk of repair of an aortic dissection.  These conditions include the following:
 Prolonged preoperative evaluation (increased length of time prior to surgery)
 Advanced age
 Comorbid disease states (e.g.: coronary artery disease)
 Aneurysm leakage
 Cardiac tamponade
 Shock - obstructive shock
 Past history of myocardial infarction 
 History of kidney failure (either acute or chronic kidney failure)

Follow-up

The long-term follow-up in individuals who survive aortic dissection involves strict blood pressure control.  The relative risk of late rupture of an aortic aneurysm is 10 times higher in individuals who have uncontrolled hypertension, compared to individuals with a systolic pressure below 130 mmHg.

The risk of death is highest in the first two years after the acute event, and individuals should be followed closely during this time period. About 29% of late deaths following surgery are due to rupture of either a dissecting aneurysm or another aneurysm. In addition, a 17% to 25% incidence exists of new aneurysm formation, typically due to dilatation of the residual false lumen. These new aneurysms are more likely to rupture, due to their thinner walls.

Serial imaging of the aorta is suggested, with MRI being the preferred imaging technique.

Prognosis

Of all people with aortic dissection, 40% die immediately and do not reach a hospital in time. Of the remainder, 1% die every hour, making prompt diagnosis and treatment a priority. Even after diagnosis, 5–20% die during surgery or in the immediate postoperative period. In ascending aortic dissection, if surgery is decided to be not appropriate, 75% die within 2 weeks. With aggressive treatment, 30-day survival for thoracic dissections may be as high as 90%.

Epidemiology
Establishing the incidence of aortic dissection has been difficult because many cases are only diagnosed after death (which may have been attributed to another cause), and is often initially misdiagnosed. Aortic dissection affects an estimated 2.0–3.5 people per every 100,000 every year. Studies from Sweden suggest that the incidence of aortic dissection may be rising. Men are more commonly affected than women: 65% of all people with aortic dissection are male. The mean age at diagnosis is 63 years. In females before the age of 40, half of all aortic dissections occur during pregnancy (typically in the third trimester or early postpartum period). Dissection occurs in about 0.6% of pregnancies.

History
The earliest fully documented case of aortic dissection is attributed to Frank Nicholls in his autopsy report of King George II of Great Britain, who had been found dead on 25 October 1760; the report describes a dissection of the aortic arch and into the pericardium. The term "aortic dissection" was introduced by the French physician J. P. Maunoir in 1802, and René Laennec labeled the condition "dissecting aneurysm". London cardiologist Thomas Bevill Peacock contributed to the understanding of the condition by publishing two series of the cases described in the literature so far: 19 cases in an 1843 review, and 80 in 1863. The characteristic symptom of tearing pain in the chest was recognized in 1855 when a case was diagnosed in life.

Surgery for aortic dissection was first introduced and developed by Michael E. DeBakey, Denton Cooley, and Oscar Creech, cardiac surgeons associated with the Baylor College of Medicine, Houston, Texas, in 1954. DeBakey developed aortic dissection himself at age 97 in 2005, and underwent surgery in 2006. Endovascular treatment of aortic dissection was developed in the 1990s.

Society and culture
Ritter Rules are a compilation of reminders, symptoms, and risk factors designed to prevent the misdiagnosis of thoracic aortic dissection. The rules were named after Three's Company star John Ritter, who died from a thoracic aortic dissection in 2003 after he was misdiagnosed and accidentally treated for a heart attack by his two doctors. The rules were developed by Dianna Milewicz of the University of Texas Health Science Center at Houston seven years after Ritter's premature death, and were jointly published by the non-profit organization in Ritter's honor and the Thoracic Aortic Disease Coalition.

Lucille Ball was diagnosed with dissecting aortic aneurysm and underwent surgery to repair her aorta and a successful seven-hour aortic valve replacement, but died days later. A greater incidence of aortic aneurysm is seen in cigarette smokers; Ball had been a heavy smoker most of her life.

Playwright Jonathan Larson, best known for the musical Rent, died in 1996 of an aortic dissection believed to be due to undiagnosed Marfan Syndrome.

Days of Our Lives and Babylon 5 actor Richard Biggs died on May 22, 2004 at the age of 44 due to complications from aortic dissection.

Lux Interior of The Cramps died at the Glendale Memorial Hospital on February 4, 2009, at the age of 62, following an aortic dissection which, contrary to initial reports about a pre-existing condition, was "sudden, shocking and unexpected".

Alan Thicke died in 2016 of type-A aortic dissection at the Providence Saint Joseph Medical Center in Burbank, at the age of 69.

Japanese actress Hiromi Tsuru died in her car from aortic dissection in 2017 at the age of 57.

Taiwanese entertainer Alien Huang died in 2020 at the age of 36.

Kentaro Miura, writer and artist of the manga Berserk, died from aortic dissection in 2021 at the age of 54.

In August 2021, New Zealand cricketer Chris Cairns was put on full life support following an aortic dissection in his home in Canberra, Australia. He was transferred to Sydney, and became paralysed from the waist down due to sustaining a stroke during surgery.

41-year-old guitarist Richie Faulkner of the heavy metal band Judas Priest had an aortic aneurysm on September 27, 2021, in the middle of the final song of their 50-minute set at a music festival. He underwent  hours of open heart surgery to repair the aortic dissection.

In May 2022, keyboardist Andy Fletcher, a founding member of the UK band Depeche Mode, died unexpectedly at home from an aortic dissection, at the age of 60.

See also
 Carotid artery dissection
 Vertebral artery dissection

References

Sources

External links

+
 
Causes of death
Medical emergencies
Vascular surgery
IgG4-related disease
Wikipedia medicine articles ready to translate
Wikipedia emergency medicine articles ready to translate